The 2008 NCAA Division I women's basketball tournament involved 64 teams playing in a single-elimination tournament to determine the 2007–08 national champion of women's NCAA Division I college basketball. It commenced on March 22, 2008, and concluded when the University of Tennessee Lady Volunteers defeated the Stanford University Cardinal 64–48 on April 8, 2008, at the St. Pete Times Forum in Tampa, Florida.

Notable events
The preliminary rounds largely followed the seeding, with every number one and number two seed advancing to the regional finals. In the Greensboro and Oklahoma City Regionals, the top seeds Connecticut and Tennessee won respectively to head to the Final Four. Connecticut had to beat Big East rival Rutgers to make the advance. Tennessee' Candace Parker was injured in the game against Texas A&M and had to leave twice, and be fitted with a sleeve to stabilize her shoulder. She still scored 26 points in a game which was won by only eight.

In the other two regionals, the two seeds prevailed. In the New Orleans Regional, LSU beat North Carolina to reach the Final Four for the fifth consecutive time, tying a record set by Connecticut between 2000 and 2004. In the Spokane Regional, Stanford beat the top seed Maryland to go to their first Final Four since 1997, but one that would be the first of a five-year string of consecutive Final Four appearances.

Connecticut and Stanford met in one semifinal. They had played each other earlier in the season at the Paradise Jam held in St. Thomas, Virgin Islands in November. The Huskies had won that game 66–54, but the team had been at full strength. Subsequent to that game Mel Thomas and Kalana Greene both starters, had season ending injuries. Connecticut cut a Stanford lead to a single point, 47–46 when Candice Wiggins hit two three-pointers to start a 10–0 run. Wiggins would go on to score 25 points in the game and would be named the Women's Basketball Coaches Association national player of the year. The Cardinal went on to win the game, and advance to the national championship.

The game between SEC foes Tennessee and LSU didn't win style points, and was described by the New York Times as "one of the ugliest games played this or any season". Tennessee led early opening up a ten-point lead at 37–27, but LSU responded with a 10–0 run to tie the game. With seconds left in the game LSU hit two free throws to take a one-point lead. Tennessee inbounded the ball to Candace Parker who passed it inside to Nicky Anosike, but her shot was deflected to Alexis Hornbuckle, who had missed seven of her field goal attempts. With under one second remaining, Hornhuckle caught the deflection and hit the winning basket. The Lady Vols won 47–46, as the two teams combined scores set an NCAA record for the fewest points scored in a semifinal game.

LSU fell to 0–5 in the Women's Final Four. Combined with the 0–6 mark of the men's team, LSU's 0-11 all-time combined Final Four mark is the worst for schools which have made multiple appearances in both the men's and women's Final Fours.

After the drama of a one-point game in the semifinal, the final game was anticlimactic. The Lady Vols pulled out to a 30–19 lead, and the Stanford Cardinal were unable to close the gap. The win gave Tennessee their second consecutive national championship and a career total of 982 wins, the most of any coach in basketball, men's or women's, along with eight national championships for coach Pat Summitt.

Subregionals

Once again, the system was the same as the Division I men's basketball tournament, with the exception that only 64 teams received bids, and there was no play-in game.  Automatic bids were secured by 31 conference champions and 33 at-large bids.

The subregionals, which once again used the "pod system", keeping most teams at or close to the home cities, were held from March 22 to March 25 at these locations:

The Pit, Albuquerque, New Mexico (Host: University of New Mexico)
Pete Maravich Assembly Center, Baton Rouge, Louisiana (Host: Louisiana State University)
Arena at Harbor Yard, Bridgeport, Connecticut (Host: Fairfield University)
Comcast Center, College Park, Maryland (Host: University of Maryland, College Park)
Wells Fargo Arena at the Iowa Events Center, Des Moines, Iowa (Host: Iowa State University)
Ted Constant Convocation Center, Norfolk, Virginia (Host: Old Dominion University)
Maples Pavilion, Stanford, California (Host: Stanford University)
Mackey Arena, West Lafayette, Indiana (Host: Purdue University)

This was the fourth and final year that eight sites hosted subregional games.  The committee, in September 2007, voted to return to the 16-site format for the early rounds starting with the 2009 tournament.

Regionals

The regions (once again named after the host cities, a practice begun in 2005) were held from March 29 to April 1 in the following regions:

Greensboro Regional, Greensboro Coliseum, Greensboro, North Carolina (Host: Atlantic Coast Conference)
New Orleans Regional, New Orleans Arena, New Orleans (Host: University of New Orleans)
Oklahoma City Regional, Ford Center, Oklahoma City (Host: University of Oklahoma)
Spokane Regional, Spokane Veterans Memorial Arena, Spokane, Washington (Host: Washington State University)

The regional winners advanced to the Final Four, held April 6 and 8, 2008 at the Tampa Bay Times Forum, in Tampa, Florida, hosted by the University of South Florida. USF and the Tampa Bay Times Forum also hosted a first and second round Men's Tournament subregional on March 21 and 23. Also, akin to the men's tournament, at the regional sites, the NCAA installed floors that were custom made for the first time.

Tournament records
 Rebounds—Sylvia Fowles, LSU, recorded 20 rebounds in the semifinal game against Tennessee, most ever recorded in an NCAA semifinal game.
 Points—Tennessee and LSU combined for 93 points (47–46) setting the record for fewest points scored by both teams combined in a semifinal game. 
 Free throws—Tennessee hit two of seven free throw attempts in the national semifinal game against LSU, the lowest free throw percentage (28.6%) recorded in an NCAA Tournament game.
 Final Four appearances—LSU appeared in their fifth consecutive Final Four, tied for the longest such streak, with Connecticut (2000–04)
 Free throws—Kansas State made 21 of 21 free throw attempts, tied with several others for 100% free throw shooting percentage in an NCAA Tournament game, while the 21 completions is the largest number of completions.

Qualifying teams – automatic
Sixty-four teams were selected to participate in the 2008 NCAA Tournament. Thirty-one conferences were eligible for an automatic bid to the 2008 NCAA tournament. Of these thirty-one automatic bids, a total of 30 teams receive automatic bids for winning their conference tournament championship. The Ivy League does not hold a tournament, so its regular season champion receives the automatic bid. Because Cornell, Dartmouth, and Harvard finished in a tie for first place, Ivy League rules called for a two-game stepladder playoff. Dartmouth defeated Harvard in the first game and went on to face Cornell for the automatic bid, which Cornell won 64–47.

Qualifying teams – at-large
Thirty-three additional teams were selected to complete the sixty-four invitations.

Tournament seeds

Bids by conference
Thirty-one conferences earned an automatic bid.  In twenty-two cases, the automatic bid was the only representative from the conference. Thirty-three additional at-large teams were selected from nine of the conferences.

Bids by state

The sixty-four teams came from thirty states, plus Washington, D.C. Texas had the most teams with six bids. Twenty states did not have any teams receiving bids.

Bracket
Data source
NOTE: All initials used are the same in the official NCAA Bracket in External Links listed below.

Greensboro Regional

Spokane Regional

New Orleans Regional

Oklahoma City Regional

Final Four – St. Pete Times Forum, Tampa, Florida 

Initials: GRE-Greensboro; SPO-Spokane; NOR-New Orleans; OKC-Oklahoma City.

* – Denotes overtime period

Record by conference

Nineteen conferences — Atlantic Sun Conference, Big Sky Conference, Big South Conference, Big West Conference, Horizon League, Ivy League, MAC, MEAC, Missouri Valley Conference, Northeast Conference, Ohio Valley Conference, Patriot League, Southern Conference, Southland, SWAC, Sun Belt Conference, Summit League, WAC and West Coast Conference — went 0–1.

All-Tournament Team

 Candace Parker, Tennessee
 Shannon Bobbitt, Tennessee
 Nicky Anosike, Tennessee
 Candice Wiggins, Stanford
 Sylvia Fowles, LSU

Game Officials

 Tina Napier(semifinal)
 Clarke Stevens (semifinal)
 Lisa Jones  (semifinal)
 June Courteau (semifinal)
 Beverly Roberts (semifinal)
 Mary Day (semifinal)
 Dee Kantner  (final)
 Eric Brewton  (final)
 Denise Brooks (final)

See also
 2008 NCAA Division II women's basketball tournament
 2008 NCAA Division III women's basketball tournament
 2008 NAIA Division I women's basketball tournament
 2008 NAIA Division II women's basketball tournament
 2008 NCAA Division I men's basketball tournament

Notes

External links

 Official bracket at NCAA.com
 Interactive bracket at NCAA.com

Tournament
NCAA Division I women's basketball tournament
NCAA Division I women's basketball tournament
NCAA Division I women's basketball tournament
Basketball in Tampa, Florida
NCAA Division I women's basketball tournament